A total solar eclipse will occur on April 20, 2061. A solar eclipse occurs when the Moon passes between Earth and the Sun, thereby totally or partly obscuring the image of the Sun for a viewer on Earth. A total solar eclipse occurs when the Moon's apparent diameter is larger than the Sun's, blocking all direct sunlight, turning day into darkness. Totality occurs in a narrow path across Earth's surface, with the partial solar eclipse visible over a surrounding region thousands of kilometres wide.

Visibility 
The eclipse will begin over Southern Russia and eastern Ukraine at sunrise and the moon shadow will move rapidly in a northeastern direction over west Kazakhstan (West Kazakhstan Region). The shadow will cover the Urals and races over the Arctic Ocean in a north-westerly direction and reaches the Svalbard archipelago. At sunset the eclipse will end just before the coast of Greenland.

The greatest eclipse will be in Russia on the east of Komi Republic (in Europe), ~120 km to south-east of Pechora.

Related eclipses

Solar eclipses 2059–2061

Saros 149

Metonic series

References

2061 04 20
2061 in science
2061 04 20
2061 04 20